Kongelig historiograf (Historicus Regius, "Historiographer Royal") was a position in the kingdom of Denmark-Norway (after 1814 Denmark) between 1594 and 1883.
The parallel office in Sweden was established in 1618, in England in 1660 and in Scotland in 1681.

The office was originally created with the aim of producing a national history of Denmark from the 13th century, a "continuation of Saxo", improving upon the first such work, published in the vernacular in 1600 by Arild Huitfeldt.

The office is not to be confused with that of kongelig ordenshistoriograf, the position of official historian of the Danish system of orders
which was established in 1808 and remains in existence today.

List of Historiographers Royal:
Niels Krag: 1594-1602
Jon Jakobsen Venusinus: 1602-1608  
Claus Christoffersen Lyschander: 1616-1623/4
Johannes Isacius Pontanus: 1618-1639 (appointed in parallel with Lyschander)
Johannes Meursius: 1624-1639
Stephan Hansen Stephanius: 1639-1650
Vitus Bering: 1650-1675
Ivar Nielsen Hertzholm (uncertain, mentioned as royal historian in the first edition of Dansk biografisk leksikon, but not in the improved third edition).
Willum Worm: 1679-1704
Christoff Heinrich Amthor: 1714-1721
Andreas Hojer: 1722-1730
Hans Gram: 1730-1748
Peter Frederik Suhm: 1787-1798
Ove Malling: 1809-1829
Caspar Frederik Wegener: 1847-1883

References
Harald Ilsøe: "Svanning, Vedel, Huitfeldt og Krag. Omkring spørgsmålet om den første historiografudnævnelse" in: Grethe Christensen, Karl-Erik Frandsen, Kai Hørby, Benito Scocozza og Alex Wittendorf (eds.),  Tradition og kritik (1984), pp. 235–258.

Historians of Denmark